The national emblem of the Karelian Autonomous Soviet Socialist Republic was adopted in 1937 by the government of the Karelian Autonomous Soviet Socialist Republic. The emblem is identical to the emblem of the Russian Soviet Federative Socialist Republic.

History 
The 11th Extraordinary Congress of the Soviets of Karelia on 16–17 June 1937 adopted the Constitution of the Karelian ASSR on 17 June 1937. The Chapter 10 of the Constitution contained the description of the symbols of the republic. The coat of arms of the Karelian ASSR was similar to the emblem of the Russian SFSR. The only difference is that the inscriptions were in Russian, Karelian, and Finnish.

First revision 
At a meeting of the Presidium of the Central Executive Committee of the Karelian ASSR on 29 December 1937, it was decided to remove the Finnish language inscription in the emblem. This happened due to the reprisals against the Finns in the Karelian ASSR in the second half of 1937.

Promotion to SSR and re-demotion to ASSR

On 8 July 1940, the Karelian ASSR was re-organized as the Karelo-Finnish SSR. The SSR was given a new emblem.

On 16 July 1956, the Karelo-Finnish SSR was demoted into the Karelian ASSR.

Second revision 
The coat of arms of the Karelian ASSR was described in the Article 111 of the Constitution of 1956, which was adopted on 20 August 1956, at the 4th session of the Supreme Soviet of the Karelian ASSR. The emblem was similar with the emblem of the Russian SFSR, but was supplemented with the motto in Finnish : Kaikkien maiden proletaarit, liittykää yhteen!

The Finnish language was restored as the official language as the Karelian ASSR, replacing the Karelian language.

Third revision 
The 1978 Constitution of the Karelian ASSR confirmed the emblem and the flag of the republic on the article 157 and 158. Some changes were made to the inscriptions, with the name of the Karelian ASSR in Finnish was added.

Regulations on the emblem were adopted by the Presidium of the Supreme Soviet of the Karelian ASSR in 1981.

Gallery

References 

Karelian Autonomous Soviet Socialist Republic
Karelian ASSR
Karelian ASSR
Karelian ASSR
Karelian ASSR
Karelian ASSR